Discovery Gateway, formerly The Children's Museum of Utah (TCMU), is an interactive, hands-on children's museum located in downtown Salt Lake City, Utah, United States.

History
The Children's Museum of Utah was founded in 1978 and opened its doors in 1983. For most of its history, TCMU was located in the former Wasatch Warm Springs building two miles north of downtown Salt Lake City. The museum started with only eight exhibits. Some of these original exhibits included the paleontology dig of a mammoth dinosaur bones, a Western Airline's 737 cockpit, the artificial heart demonstration, the frozen bubble box using dry ice, and the KSL news station for children. That year, it had become evident that TCMU had reached the physical limits imposed by its current building, and the decision was made to relocate and expand to better serve the community. In 2002, a bond issue was approved by Salt Lake County voters to fund the relocation of TCMU to a new, larger building in the Gateway District of Salt Lake City. Ground was broken on the new Museum on 22 September 2005. Less than one year later, on 16 September 2006, TCMU opened to the public at its current location and officially became Discovery Gateway.

Exhibits
Everything at Discovery Gateway is designed with kids in mind. The exhibits are all interactive and hands-on. Exhibits on the second floor of the museum include the Garden, where kids can play music together on a giant marimba, keep an enormous machine humming, or peer into a “penny drop” to see how every little bit adds up. Just behind the Garden is Kid's Eye View, a kid-sized town where kids can shop in the Market, build structures in the Construction Zone, or feed the animals on the Utah Family Farm. Within Kid's Eye View is Hatch, Waddle, and Fly, an area dedicated just to children under the age of three.

The third floor of the museum features the Story Factory, where kids direct the action by putting on a play, drawing a comic strip, or making a stop-motion animated film.  Also located on the third floor is the Studio, where the worlds of science, invention, and art meet.  The museum's outdoor terrace houses Saving Lives From The Sky, which includes a real Intermountain Healthcare Life Flight helicopter for visitors to learn about rescue operations.

Special exhibits
A special exhibits gallery hosts rotating exhibits from museums around the nation.  Previous exhibits have included Robots: The Interactive Exhibition, Sesame Street Presents: The Body, and Invention at Play.

Programs
Discovery Gateway's programs explore science, art, and the humanities. Workshops and classes are geared to meet the needs of children ages birth - 12. Early Childhood Education classes take place daily in the Curiosity Shop and let kids practice fine and gross motor skills. Programs and workshops for older kids take place in the Workshop Room and often focus on the exhibits at the museum. Discovery Gateway prints a calendar of classes every month.

In 2012 Discovery Gateway introduced Sensory Inclusive Afternoon, a feature in which they dim lights and cut noise in order to make the museum and its exhibits more autism friendly.

The museum began a virtual concert series during the 2020 COVID-19 pandemic. The following year they expanded to outdoor in-person concerts.

Outreach
Discovery Gateway offers a chemistry program, Reaction Time, to every 5th grade class in the state of Utah. Over 55,000 children from every county in Utah have participated in this program.

Junior Achievement city
Discovery Gateway, in conjunction with Junior Achievement of Utah, operates Junior Achievement City, the only JA Enterprise Village/Finance Park program facility within  of Salt Lake City. Junior Achievement City offers hands-on experiences for school groups that support learning about economics, the free enterprise system, career options, and personal finance. Junior Achievement City is located on the fourth floor of the museum, and is currently open only to school groups.

References

External links

 Discovery Gateway Website

Children's museums in Utah
Museums in Salt Lake City
1978 establishments in Utah